The United States secretary of agriculture is the head of the United States Department of Agriculture. The position carries similar responsibilities to those of agriculture ministers in other governments.

The department includes several organizations. The 297,000 mi2 (770,000 km2) of national forests and grasslands are managed by the United States Forest Service.  The safety of food produced and sold in the United States is ensured by the United States Food Safety and Inspection Service.  The Food Stamp Program works with the states to provide food to low-income people. 

Secretary of Agriculture is a Level I position in the Executive Schedule, thus earning a salary of US$221,400, as of January 2021.

Since February 24, 2021, the current secretary is Tom Vilsack, who had previously served as the 30th secretary of agriculture in the Obama administration.

List of secretaries of agriculture
When the Department of Agriculture was established in 1862, its executive was a non-Cabinet position called the commissioner of agriculture.  The commissioners of agriculture were:

The position of secretary of agriculture was created when the department was elevated to Cabinet status in 1889.  The following is a list of secretaries of agriculture, since the creation of the office in 1889.

 Parties
 (14)
 (18)

Status

Line of succession

The line of succession for the secretary of agriculture is as follows:

Deputy Secretary of Agriculture
Under Secretary of Agriculture for Farm and Foreign Agriculture Services
Assistant Secretary of Agriculture for Administration
Under Secretary of Agriculture for Food, Nutrition, and Consumer Services
Under Secretary of Agriculture for Research, Education, and Economics
Under Secretary of Agriculture for Food Safety
Under Secretary of Agriculture for Natural Resources and Environment
Under Secretary of Agriculture for Rural Development
Under Secretary of Agriculture for Marketing and Regulatory Programs
General Counsel of the Department of Agriculture
Chief of Staff, Office of the Secretary
State Executive Directors of the Farm Service Agency (in order of seniority by length of unbroken tenure) for the States of: 
California
Iowa
Kansas
Regional Administrators of the Food and Nutrition Service (in order of seniority by length of unbroken tenure) for the: 
Mountain Plains Regional Office (Denver, Colorado)
Midwest Regional Office (Chicago, Illinois) 
Western Regional Office (San Francisco, California)
Chief Financial Officer of the Department of Agriculture
Assistant Secretary of Agriculture for Civil Rights
Assistant Secretary of Agriculture for Congressional Relations

References

External links

|-

Agriculture
Secretary
Agriculture
 
USA
1889 establishments in the United States